NCAA March Madness 2005 is the 2004 installment in the NCAA March Madness series. Former Connecticut, Charlotte Bobcats, New Orleans Hornets, Washington Wizards, and New Orleans Pelicans player Emeka Okafor is featured on the cover.

Soundtrack
The soundtrack of the game uses college band versions of licensed songs. The songs used are "Last Resort" by Papa Roach, "Hey Mama" by The Black Eyed Peas, "Day-O" by Harry Belafonte, "The Middle" by Jimmy Eat World, "A Little Less Conversation" by Elvis Presley, "Hanging by a Moment" by Lifehouse and "Disco Inferno" by The Trammps.

Reception

The game received "generally favorable reviews" on both platforms according to the review aggregation website Metacritic.

See also
NBA Live 2005

References

External links
 

2004 video games
Basketball video games
Cancelled GameCube games
EA Sports games
NCAA video games
North America-exclusive video games
PlayStation 2 games
Video games developed in Canada
Xbox games